Leele may refer to:

Lele people, an ethnic group of the Democratic Republic of the Congo
Ouka Leele (born 1957), Spanish photographer
Leele, a character in the animated series Gravion

See also
Lele (disambiguation)